Rhopalosoma nearcticum is a species of rhopalosomatid wasp in the family Rhopalosomatidae. It is found in the Americas between the United States and Brazil.

References

Rhopalosomatidae
Hymenoptera of South America
Hymenoptera of North America
Parasitic wasps
Insects described in 1943
Taxa named by Charles Thomas Brues
Articles created by Qbugbot